Palapedia is a genus of crabs in the family Xanthidae, containing the following species:

Palapedia bongensis (Serène, 1972)
Palapedia hendersoni (Rathbun, 1902)
Palapedia integra (De Haan, 1835)
Palapedia marquesa (Serène, 1972)
Palapedia nitida (Stimpson, 1858)
Palapedia obliquefrons (Dai, Yang, Song & Chen, 1986)
Palapedia pelsartensis (Serène, 1972)
Palapedia quadriceps (Yokoya, 1936)
Palapedia rastripes (Müller, 1887)
Palapedia royFdhdei (Serène, 1972)
Palapedia serenei Ng, 1993
Palapedia truncatifrons (Sakai, 1974)
Palapedia valentini Ng, 1993
Palapedia wilsoni (Serène, 1972)
Palapedia yongshuensis (Dai, Cai & Yang, 1994)

References

Xanthoidea